Xiphotheca is a genus of flowering plants in the legume family, Fabaceae. It belongs to the subfamily Faboideae. Members of this genus can be distinguished by:
"(1) the presence of bracteoles in most species; (2) the fusion of the bracts with the base of the pedicel; (3) the laterally compressed pods; and (4) the accumulation of anabasine as a major alkaloid."

Species
Xiphotheca comprises the following species:

Section Congestae

 Xiphotheca fruticosa (L.) A. L. Schutte & B.-E. van Wyk
 Xiphotheca guthriei (L. Bolus) A. L. Schutte & B.-E. van Wyk
 Xiphotheca lanceolata (E. Mey.) Eckl. & Zeyh.
 Xiphotheca reflexa (Thunb.) A. L. Schutte & B.-E. van Wyk

Section Xiphotheca
 Xiphotheca canescens (Thunb.) A. L. Schutte & B.-E. van Wyk
 Xiphotheca cordifolia A. L. Schutte & B.-E. van Wyk
 Xiphotheca elliptica (DC.) A. L. Schutte & B.-E. van Wyk
 Xiphotheca phylicoides A. L. Schutte & B.-E. van Wyk

 Xiphotheca tecta (Thunb.) A. L. Schutte & B.-E. van Wyk

References

Podalyrieae
Fabaceae genera